Searching for the Wrong-Eyed Jesus is a 2003 documentary film about the American South starring Jim White. Commissioned by the BBC, it documents the intersection of country music and Christianity in the United States. It was inspired by White's similarly titled album The Mysterious Tale of How I Shouted Wrong-Eyed Jesus.

The film was directed and photographed by Andrew Douglas, written by Steve Haisman, and edited by Michael Elliot. It was executive-produced by Steve Golin and Anthony Wall, and features the music of Jim White, Johnny Dowd, The Handsome Family, David Eugene Edwards of 16 Horsepower, Rev. Gary Howlington, The Singing Hall Sisters, David Johansen, Melissa Swingle and Lee Sexton. It also features the author Harry Crews.

Music

Jim White Presents: Music from Searching For the Wrong-Eyed Jesus
In 2005, an official soundtrack to the film was released, containing the following songs.

Wrong Eyed Jesus Official Soundtrack

See also
Southern Gothic
Americana Music

References

External links

Documentary films about Christianity in the United States
BBC television documentaries
2003 films
Documentary films about country music and musicians
2000s road movies
American road movies
Films set in the United States
2000s English-language films
2000s American films
2000s British films